Forever After is a 1926 American silent drama film directed by F. Harmon Weight and starring Lloyd Hughes, Mary Astor and Hallam Cooley.

Cast
 Lloyd Hughes as Theodore Wayne 
 Mary Astor as Jennie Clayton 
 Hallam Cooley as Jack Randall 
 David Torrence as Mr. Clayton, Jennie's Father 
 Eulalie Jensen as Mrs. Clayton 
 Alec B. Francis as Mr. Wayne, Theodore's Father 
 Lila Leslie as Mrs. Wayne

References

Bibliography
 Munden, Kenneth White. The American Film Institute Catalog of Motion Pictures Produced in the United States, Part 1. University of California Press, 1997.

External links

1926 films
1926 drama films
Silent American drama films
Films directed by F. Harmon Weight
American silent feature films
1920s English-language films
First National Pictures films
American black-and-white films
1920s American films